The One and Only is an entertainment talent contest made by the BBC. It was broadcast on BBC One and hosted by Graham Norton. The aim of the show is to find a musical tribute act to perform in a three-month stint in Las Vegas. Each week throughout January and February 2008 one of their number was lost after a public vote, and the other acts then chose who should go through based on their second performance.
The Judges were David Grant and Carrie Grant. The show was won on 16 February 2008 by Katy Setterfield as Dusty Springfield.

Concept
The top twelve contestants were emulating one famous musician, both past and present.
These musicians are Britney Spears, Cher, Diana Ross, Dusty Springfield, Elton John, Frank Sinatra, Kylie Minogue, Lionel Richie, Madonna, Robbie Williams, Rod Stewart, and Tom Jones. Each week the contestants performed a song by their idols, after which the public voted. The two contestants with the fewest votes then had to sing again in front of a panel of the safe contestants. These contestants then voted to save one of the bottom two performers, and the contestant with the least support from their fellow contestants was eliminated.

Contestants
The top twelve contestants were chosen from thousands of potential contestants around the country to participate in a series of auditions, from which a top three for each tribute act was chosen. These final three contestants then went on to audition in front of a selection of "superfans" of their chosen tribute act, who chose the act who would go through to the final twelve. The final twelve contestants were:

Anthony Adams
Anthony was a 52-year-old delivery driver and Frank Sinatra tribute act from Poole, Dorset. Anthony had always wanted a career in music but had never had any major success in this field. Anthony once set up a Sinatra tribute band called "Simply Sinatra" and was persuaded to audition for the show by a customer of his. Anthony's favourite Sinatra song was "Three Coins in the Fountain". Anthony finished in second place, as announced on the Final Show.

Ed Hintze
Ed was a 34-year-old music teacher and Elton John impersonator from Weymouth. Ed performed his first solo gig at the age of twelve, which consisted of playing the keyboards at his local pub. After being inspired by another tribute act Ed began a tribute to Elton John in 1992. Ed lives with his wife and two children, and enjoys spending his free time cooking gourmet meals for her. Ed's favourite Elton John song is "Sorry Seems to be the Hardest Word". He was also the only performer on the show who played an instrument live as well as singing. Ed was Eliminated in Week Four after losing the student Vote against Cher.

Evelyne Brink
Evelyne, who originates from Frankfurt in Germany, was a 31-year-old Madonna lookalike and soundalike. She has lived all over the World before settling in London, including a period in the United States when Evelyne lived in the same New York City district that Madonna once lived in. Evelyne was always told that she looked like Madonna, but it wasn't until 2003 that she first performed as Madonna in Purley, Surrey. Evelyne worked in promotions and waitressing, as well as studying at the New York School of Music and Television. Evelyne was in the Bottom Two in Week One, and was Eliminated Week Two.

Greg Dorell
Greg was a 41-year-old Rod Stewart tribute act. Since leaving school Greg had worked as a butcher and in a hairdressing apprenticeship. Greg's talent was first spotted by an ex-girlfriend when she heard him singing along to a Rod Stewart track and asked him to give a performance at the London Palladium for a children's dance concert she was involved in. He gigged regularly in his local area and around the country, and said his favourite Rod Stewart songs are "Baby Jane" and "Forever Young". Greg was Eliminated Week One.

Joanna Berns
Joanna was a 35-year-old Cher impersonator from Hertfordshire. Joanna first put together her Cher tribute act in 1998, but had been singing since the age of four. Joanna made a living from performing as Cher and performs her tribute act each year on a Caribbean cruise ship and has performed as Cher in Dubai. Joanna came from a very musical family, and her current boyfriend Steve was also a singer, who sometimes performed with her. Joanna's favourite Cher song was "Love and Understanding". Joanna was in the Bottom Three in Weeks Four and Five, but was saved by the student Vote. Cher was Eliminated in the first show of the Final Week, and did not get the chance to perform in the second programme.

Katy Setterfield
Katy was a 37-year-old Dusty Springfield impersonator from High Wycombe. Katy had been a musician all her life, but when she was not singing she enjoys spending time with her horses, walking her dog and jogging. Katy had travelled all over the World in a stage act which paid tribute to the music of Dusty Springfield, as well as Cher and Tina Turner. Katy had the ability to contort her voice to fit the sound of various musical superstars, but said that her favourite was Dusty. Katy's husband, Andy Hodge, was the bass player in her stage act, and said her favourite Dusty Springfield song was "Son of a Preacher Man". Katy was announced as the Winner of The One and Only on the final show.

 www.katysetterfield.com

Moni Tivoni
Moni, a 27-year-old supermarket worker and Lionel Richie tribute act had been singing and performing since he was a small child. Moni's mother was a huge Motown fan and he immersed himself in the music. Despite never having performed as Lionel Richie on stage Moni performed part-time in a soul vocal group. Moni's favourite Lionel songs were "Penny Lover", "Say You, Say Me" and "All Night Long (All Night)". Moni went on to finish in Third Place on the final night. Moni later went on and auditioned for The Voice UK in 2013 and made it to the knockout rounds.

Siam Hurlock
Siam was a 39-year-old Diana Ross tribute act from London. Singing and performing had always been Siam's dream, and as a child became obsessed with Motown performers, dreaming that one day she could be like Diana Ross. As a child Siam was too nervous to performs in front of an audience, even running off of the stage at the Hackney Empire once as nerves got the better of her. Before The One and Only Siam worked as a hairdresser in London, but had also worked in the West End, once playing Diana Ross in the musical "Dancing in the Streets". Siam crafted her own costumes that accompany her on stage and said that her favourite Diana Ross song was "Ain't No Mountain High Enough". Siam was in the Bottom Two in Week 2, and was Eliminated in Week 5 after losing the Public Vote against Cher.

Simon Abbotts
Simon was a 42-year-old Tom Jones tribute act. He first started performing as Tom Jones when he was 25 years old and had been performing regularly as him ever since. Simon once had a single chart in Germany with the band Pulse. Simon's greatest ambition was to perform in Las Vegas and to sing on television. His favourite Tom Jones song was "I'll Never Fall in Love Again". Simon was Eliminated in Week Five when he polled Bottom of the Public Vote.

Tara Stafford-Allen
Tara, a 29-year-old police officer from Lincolnshire, was a Britney Spears impersonator. Tara had only been performing as Britney for nine months, but had been singing since she was 12 years old. As a child an illness affecting Tara's immune system left her unable to pursue her love of acting and singing, and doctors feared she may lose her legs. Tara originally trained as a riding instructor, pursuing her other passion of horses, but later decided to re-train as a police officer. Tara lived next door to her parents in Lincolnshire and said that the only time she had ever been apart from them was when she briefly attended a boarding school. Tara's favourite Britney Spears track was "I Love Rock N Roll". Tara was Eliminated in Week Three.

Tony Lewis
Tony, was a 27-year-old former plumber and air conditioning engineer from Lancashire. In his spare time he worked as a Robbie Williams tribute act. Tony first started working as a tribute act when he entered a karaoke competition and won. Tony had been following Robbie's concert tours since 1996 and had been a successful Robbie Williams Tribute Act for more than five years. Tony's favourite Robbie Williams song was "Let Me Entertain You". Robbie was Eliminated in the first show of the Final Week, and did not get the chance to perform in the second programme.

Victoria Jones
Victoria was a 25-year-old Kylie Minogue impersonator. Victoria had always been a Kylie fan; as a child her mother would curl her hair so she could look like her idol, and by the time she was fifteen years old she was performing Kylie track on stage in a cabaret act. Victoria's tribute act included a performance of "Better the Devil You Know" dressed in those famous hot-pants. Despite Victoria's obvious talent it was only when she was involved in a car accident the previous year that she truly decided to follow her dream. Victoria was highly competitive and determined to win the One and Only, and said her favourite Kylie record was "Better the Devil You Know". Victoria was in the Bottom Two in Week Three, and Eliminated Week Four.

Live Show Details

Week One

Madonna Tribute Act Evelyne Brink and Rod Stewart Tribute Act Greg Dorrell found themselves in the Bottom Two. After performing again Rod Stewart was Eliminated by the surviving performers with only 1 of 10 votes - choosing Madonna to stay.

Week Two

Madonna Tribute Act Evelyne Brink and Diana Ross Tribute Act Siam Hurlock found themselves in the Bottom Two. After performing again Madonna was Eliminated by the surviving performers with 2 out of a possible 9 votes - choosing Diana Ross to stay.

Week Three

Britney Spears Tribute Act Tara Stafford-Allen and Kylie Minogue Tribute Act Victoria Jones found themselves in the Bottom Two. After performing again Britney Spears was Eliminated by the surviving performers with 3 out of a possible 8 votes - choosing Kylie Minogue to stay.

Week Four

This Week the three acts with the fewest votes were revealed; Cher Tribute Act Joanna Berns, Elton John Tribute Act Ed Hintze and Kylie Minogue Tribute Act Victoria Jones. The act with the fewest votes (Kylie Minogue) was immediately Eliminated, leaving Cher and Elton John to face the Vote. After they performed again Elton John was Eliminated by the surviving performers with 2 out of a possible 6 votes - choosing Cher to stay.

Week Five

This Week the three acts with the fewest votes were revealed; Cher Tribute Act Joanna Berns, Diana Tribute Act Siam Hurlock and Tom Jones Tribute Act Simon Abbots. The act with the fewest votes (Tom Jones) was immediately Eliminated, leaving Cher and Diana Ross to face the Vote. After they performed again Diana was Eliminated by the surviving performers with 1 out of a possible 4 votes - choosing Cher to stay.

Final Week Six

Elimination Table

References

External links
 
www.dusty-springfield.com - The Dusty Springfield Network

BBC Television shows
British reality television series
Singing talent shows
2008 British television series debuts
2008 British television series endings